Listrocerum aspericorne is a species of beetle in the family Cerambycidae. It was described by Chevrolat in 1855. It is known from Nigeria.

References

Endemic fauna of Nigeria
Dorcaschematini
Beetles described in 1855